Przemysław Sadowski (born March 18, 1975) is a Polish actor.

Biography 
He was born in Hajnówka, but grew up in Białystok. He participated first degree music school in piano and guitar. Before he completed his studies in 1999 at the National Film School in Łódź, he debuted first on scene in the role as an Elf in a performance entitled A Midsummer Night's Dream in Stefan Jaracz's Theatre, which he participated between 1997 and 1999. He later performed in theatres: Polskim w Szczecin(2000), Scena Prezentacje in Warsaw (2000, 2002 to 2004), Nowym Praga (2005) and Tadeusz Łomnicki's Na Woli (2006).

In 2000 for the first time he played roles in four different films: Syzyfowe prace, Pierwszy Milion, Strefa ciszy and Enduro Bojz. After playing several roles in television dramas like Więzy krwi (2001), Zostać miss (2001), Klan (2001 to 2002) and Na dobre i na złe (2002) he became the college love in TVN's Magda M..

In 2006 he took part in the fourth edition of Taniec z gwiazdami, in which he achieved fourth place and where his dancing partner was Ewa Szabatin.

On September 4, 2004 he married actress Agnieszka Warchulska, with whom he has two sons – Jan (born 2005) and Franciszek (born 2011). He also has a daughter, Małgorzata (born 1997) from a previous relationship.

Filmography

Films

Syzyfowe prace as an assistant
Pierwszy milion as Jacek Berger Kurczewski "Kurtz"
Strefa ciszy as a French
Enduro Bojz as a Soviet
Where Eskimos Live as escapee
In Desert and Wilderness (2001 film) as a Major 
Reich as a drug dealer
Julie Walking Home as a wounded man
Siedem grzechów popcooltury as Max
Tylko mnie kochaj as a police officer
Outlanders as Jan Jasiński
Droga do kraju as Mirek
Cisza as Tadeusz Brzozowski 
Siedem minut as Piotr Winkler
Układ zamknięty as Marek Stawski
Tajemnica Westerplatte as Piotr Buder
Run Boy Run as Kowalski

Television Films

Polonaise as Maciek

Television Drama Soaps

Syzyfowe prace as an assistant
Mordziaki as a policeman (episode 8)
Pierwszy milion − as Jacek Berger Kurczewski "Kurtz"
Klan − as doctor Łukasz Kobielski
Zostać miss as Artur "Arczi"
Więzy krwi as Łukasz Bronowicz, Józef's son, forester
W pustyni i w puszczy as Major
Na dobre i na złe as Piotr Michałowski (episode 87)
Samo Życie as Kacper Szpunar
Fala zbrodni as Budrys 
Sublokatorzy as an agent (episode. 1)
Pensjonat pod Różą as Gabriel (episode 3); Kacper, Mai's husband (episode 64)
Bulionerzy as Damian Berger
Magda M. as Filip Starski as Magda's true college love
Kryminalni as Artur Zimak, Auguścików's neighbour (episode 46)
Ranczo as Arkadiusz Stolarkiewicz vel Jan Kowalski (episode 22 to 24)
Niania as Paweł Walicki (episode 67)
Determinator as Cezary Bogucki
Londyńczycy as Darek
Naznaczony as Eryk, Mileny's brother
Usta usta as Robert Langer
Czas honoru as the representative of The Main Station Of The ZWZ, chief of the second region II KG ZWZ (episode 39); Brodowicz (for fourth and fifth series)
Duch w dom as Jurek (episode 4)
Hotel 52 as Błażej, Andrzej's friend
Prawo Agaty as Arkadiusz Jezierski (episode 25)
Na krawędzi as Andrzej Czyż
Ja to mam szczęście as Stefan, Joanny's former husband
Komisarz Alex as Artur Hoffer (episode 24)
2XL as Karol Zabawski, Laura's husband

References

1975 births
Living people
Polish male film actors
Polish male television actors
Polish male soap opera actors
Polish male stage actors
Polish male voice actors
Polish male radio actors
People from Hajnówka County
People from Białogard
Jagiellonia Białystok players
Łódź Film School alumni
Actors from Łódź